The Siena synagogue is a notable, historic synagogue in Siena, Italy.

A substantial Jewish community is recorded in Siena beginning in the 14th century. In 1571 the Medici restricted Jewish residence to a defined neighborhood, or ghetto, and it was in this neighborhood that a synagogue was built on the Vicole dell Scotte very close to the Piazza del Campo. The Jews were emancipated from the requirement of living in a ghetto in 1860.

The present synagogue was erected in 1786 on the site of the older synagogue. Because Jews in that era were prohibited from building houses of worship identifiable from the street, the stone facade of the four story building is plain, resembling neighboring residential buildings. The sanctuary is located on the first floor (one flight up from street level). It has an elaborate neoclassical interior, with a lofty baroque ceiling featuring a large crowned tablet of the Ten Commandments enthroned in clouds of glory. Two tiers of balconies on the building's third and fourth stories have views into the room through elaborate baroque grills. Furniture is arranged in the historic style of the Italian Jewish community, with the bimah in the center of the room. The Torah Ark is a classical marble cabinet with marble pillars and entablature towering almost the height of the room.

The architect was Giuseppe del Rosso of Florence, the master builders were Niccolo Ianda and Pietro Rossi.

The synagogue is open to visitors.

The historic Jewish cemetery of Siena also survives and is open to visitors.

References

Buildings and structures in Siena
Orthodox synagogues in Italy
18th-century synagogues
Synagogues in Italy
18th-century architecture in Italy